Han Song (韩松, born 1965) is a Chinese science fiction writer and a journalist at the Xinhua News Agency.

Life
Born 1965 in Chongqing, Han works as a journalist for the state news agency Xinhua. His first short story collection, Gravestone of the Universe 宇宙墓碑 was published in 1981 in the Taiwanese journal Huanxiang 幻象. It waited ten years for publication in the People's Republic of China because publishers found its tone too dark.

Han has received the Chinese Galaxy Award for fiction six times. The LA Times described him as China's premier science fiction writer.

Work
According to the China Daily, Han describes himself as a "staunch nationalist at heart", and his work is critical of China's desire to Westernize as fast as possible: He believes that "fast-track development does not agree with core Asian values", and that adoption of the "alien entities" of science, technology and modernization by the Chinese will turn them into monsters.

A principal subject of Han's work is the conflict between China and the United States, but he also satirizes the overreaching Chinese state. Most of his works are banned in mainland China.

Bibliography
Han's novels, which are unpublished in English as of 2011, include among many others:
My Homeland Does Not Dream, whose subject is the state drugging people so that they work while sleeping.
2066: Red Star Over America (2000), describing the collapse of the United States in a world dominated by China.
Red Ocean (2004)
Subway (2010), a novel of Chinese spacefarers returning to a post-apocalyptic Beijing subway.

A short story of Han's, The Wheel of Samsara, was published in English translation in the 2009 The Apex Book of World SF edited by Lavie Tidhar.

References

External links

 Entry in the Encyclopedia of Science Fiction

Living people
1965 births
Chinese science fiction writers
Writers from Chongqing
20th-century Chinese male writers
21st-century Chinese writers